The World Congress of Intellectuals in Defense of Peace was an international conference held on 25 to 28 August 1948 at Wrocław University of Technology. It was organized in the aftermath of the Second World War by the authorities of the Polish People's Republic and the Soviet Union, and aimed against American imperialism.

The congress was part of Soviets and Stalin’s goal of slowing down the Western nuclear weapon program by the West, by influencing the world public opinion through framing of the communist powers as supporters of peace, and on the opposite side, portraying the West as a threat to peace.

Organization
The Congress was officially proposed by Polish communist Jerzy Borejsza, and conceptualized by Andrei Zhdanov in the Soviet Union. It was held on 25 to 28 August 1948 at Wrocław University of Technology. It cost the organizers about 100 million Polish zloties.

The topics of the speeches and the selection of speakers were carefully planned. In addition to the lectures condemning American imperialism, a place was also found for the fight against fascism and clericalism. The number of delegations was also determined: the most numerous was the 50-person Soviet delegation, the delegations from France, Italy and Great Britain were to have 35-40 people each, the Hungarian and Czechoslovak delegations were to have around 30 people, and the Romanian and Bulgarian delegations had 15 people each. The plan was also for Congress to establish a peace prize that would offset the Nobel Prize.

Program
The Congress was part of the Soviet-supported Poland movement  aimed at slowing down the development of nuclear weaponry by the West  (at that time, USSR did not have nuclear weapons of its own, although it was engaged in a crash program to develop them). Polish historian Wojciech Tomasik claimed that the Congress was an example of the Soviet Union hijacking the concept of "defending peace", to justify its own policies. The aim of the Congress was to influence world public opinion, portraying the Eastern Bloc countries as supporters of peace and the Western Bloc countries as a threat to it. Dąbrowska in her memoirs stated that "the Congress was not aimed at preventing the war in general, but at preventing an American-Soviet war from talking place now, at the moment in which the USSR is in the inferior position."

Some Polish activists and politicians initially saw the congress as a neutral event that would boost Polish relations with the West. However, in reaction to a strongly anti-American speech where the Soviet delegation leader, writer Alexander Fadeyev compared American democracy to fascism, attacked writers and intellectuals such as John Dos Passos, T. S. Eliot, André Malraux, Eugene O'Neill and Jean-Paul Sartre. A number of western delegates such as Huxley or Curie declared themselves offended. Some, including Julian Huxley (then director of UNESCO), Léger and Taylor left the conference in protest. Huxley accused the Congress of intolerance to non-Communist viewpoints and stated "such behaviour cannot lead to peace, and may help to promote war". Writer Ilya Ehrenburg then gave a conciliatory speech on behalf of the Soviet delegation, and Borejsza convinced almost everyone to remain at the Congress.

A number of other speeches shared much of the anti-American rhetoric. Journalist François Bondy noted that the Soviet delegation was particularly unfriendly and aggressive towards many of the Western delegates, and their actions sowed much discord into the conference, ruining the attempts by Polish delegates to salvage the neutral tone of the event. The final act of the conference was a resolution to defend world peace. The resolution applauded democracy which saved the world from fascism, and criticized the governments (but explicitly, not the people) of United States and United Kingdom, arguing that a small group of greed-motivated individuals in America and Europe "inherited" the evils of fascism, and are planning a coup d'état against the world's peace. Only 11 delegates voted against (7 out of 32 from the US, and 4 out of 32 from the UK). Another source notes that 371 out of 391 delegates voted in support.

Simultaneously with the Congress, another Wrocław event occurred: the Exhibition of the Regained Territories, another international event, this one used by the Poles to explain the territorial changes of Poland after World War II and the securing of the so-called Regained Territories. Together, the Conference and the Exhibition aimed to convince the world that the border change was beneficial to Europe and the world peace.

The Congress elected a permanent International Committee of Intellectuals in Defence of Peace (also known as the International Committee of Intellectuals for Peace and the International Liaison Committee of Intellectuals for Peace), with headquarters in Paris.  The Congress called for the establishment of national branches and the holding of national meetings similar to the World Congress. In accordance with this policy, a Scientific and Cultural Conference for World Peace was held in New York City in March 1949.

Delegates

A large number of notable individuals, primarily supportive of left-wing policies, participated in the conference. They included:

 George Abbe
 Alexander Abusch
 Kazimierz Ajdukiewicz
 Sibilla Aleramo
 Jorge Amado
 Albin Amelin 
 Mulk Raj Anand
 Martin Andersen Nexø
 Ivo Andrić
 Louis Aragon
 Ewa Bandrowska-Turska
 Umberto Barbaro
 Jean-Louis Barrault
 Julien Benda
 J. D. Bernal
 Erik Blomberg
 John Boyd Orr
 Bertolt Brecht
 Władysław Broniewski
 Jean Bruller
 Giorgio Caproni
 Aimé Césaire
 Józef Chałasiński
Le Corbusier
 Norman Corwin
 Eugénie Cotton
 Edward Crankshaw
 James Crowther
 Jan Czekanowski
 Maria Dąbrowska
 Jo Davidson
 Jan Dembowski
 Dominique Desanti
 Xawery Dunikowski
 Clifford Durr
 Virginia Foster Durr
 Ilya Ehrenburg
 Hanns Eisler
 Paul Éluard
 Alexander Fadeyev
 Howard Fast
 Ernst Fischer
 Grzegorz Fitelberg
 Max Frisch
 Louis Golding
 Graham Greene
 William Gropper
 Renato Guttuso
 J. B. S. Haldane
 Ludwik Hirszfeld
 Aldous Huxley
 Julian Huxley
 Jarosław Iwaszkiewicz
 Hewlett Johnson
 Frédéric Joliot-Curie
 Irène Joliot-Curie
 Albert E. Kahn
 Freda Kirchwey
 Oleksandr Korniychuk
 Tadeusz Kotarbiński
 Leon Kruczkowski
 Julian Krzyżanowski
 Fernand Léger
 Leonid Leonov
 Jack Lindsay
 Stanisław Lorentz
 Berthold Lubetkin
 György Lukács
 André Mandouze
 Kingsley Martin
 Hans Mayer
 Leopoldo Méndez
 Edita Morris
 Ira Victor Morris
 Léon Moussinac
 Zofia Nałkowska
 Otto Nathan
 Pablo Neruda
 Hans Jacob Nilsen
 Stanisław Ossowski
 Aleksandr Palladin
 Aubrey Pankey
 Andrzej Panufnik
 Jan Parandowski
 Max Pechstein
 Pablo Picasso
 Oleg Pisarzhevsky (ru)
 Salvatore Quasimodo
 Albert Rakoto Ratsimamanga
 Alves Redol
 Madeleine Renaud
 James Maude Richards
 O. John Rogge
 Anna Seghers
 Harlow Shapley
 Mikhail Sholokhov
 Wacław Sierpiński
 Minnette de Silva
 Antoni Słonimski
 Olaf Stapledon
 Hugo Steinhaus
 Donald Ogden Stewart
 Marika Stiernstedt 
 Franciszek Strynkiewicz
 Wojciech Świętosławski
 Yevgeny Tarle
 Władysław Tatarkiewicz
 Rafał Taubenschlag
 A. J. P. Taylor
 Feliks Topolski
 Mirzo Tursunzoda
 Julian Tuwim
 Roger Vailland
 Karl Vennberg
 Samad Vurgun
 Jean Wahl
 Colston Warne
 Ella Winter
 Friedrich Wolf
 Kazimierz Wyka
 David Zaslavsky
 Jerzy Zawieyski

Albert Einstein sent a letter which was read to the delegates – but only after it had been censored to remove the call for a world government that would safeguard the uses of nuclear energy. Henry A. Wallace, former Vice President of the United States under Franklin D. Roosevelt and the Progressive Party's candidate in the 1948 U.S. presidential election, also sent a message of support. Overall, the Congress was attended by about 600 individuals from 46 countries.

Julia Pirotte, a photojournalist known for her work in the French Resistance, covered the event.

Aftermath
The conference was one of the precursors to the Soviet-dominated World Peace Council organization, which for decades would attempt to influence the world's peace movement to support a more pro-Soviet and anti-American stance.

In the United States, a pro-American, anti-Soviet Cultural and Scientific Conference for World Peace was held in New York City in March 1949.

See also
List of anti-war organizations
List of peace activists
World Peace Council
Lviv Anti-Fascist Congress of Cultural Workers

References

External links

 Einstein's letter is published in 
 Photos from the Congress at wroclaw.hydral.com.pl
 Photos from the Congress at fotohistoria.pl
 World Peace Council
 Time magazine, Monday, Sep. 17, 1951 
 Canadian Peace Congress
 Encyclopedia of the Cold War, Volume 1 - Page 962
 Pathé news film of the Congress 
 Polish Film Chronicle film of the Congress 

1948 in international relations
1948 in Poland
1948 conferences
History of Wrocław
World Peace Council
Political congresses
Peace conferences